During the 1996 Norwegian football season, Rosenborg won the Norwegian Premier League.

Kit
Squad at end of season

Squad
Squad at end of season

Left club during season

Transfers

Out
  Tom Kåre Staurvik -  NAC Breda
  Steffen Iversen -  Tottenham Hotspur, £2,500,000, December
  Kåre Ingebrigtsen -  Lillestrøm

Results

Tippeligaen

Table

Champions League

Qualifying round

Group stage

Quarter-finals

References

1996
Rosenborg BK
Norwegian football championship-winning seasons